Entrants to the 1924 Tour de France included several past and future winners such as defending champion Henri Pélissier (1923), Philippe Thys (1913, 1914, 1920), Lucien Buysse (1926) and Nicolas Frantz (1927, 1928).

After the 1923 Tour de France, the winner Henri Pélissier had said that the runner-up Bottecchia would win the race.

By starting number

By nationality

References

1924 Tour de France
1924